Yonker is an unincorporated locality in Senlac Rural Municipality No. 411, Saskatchewan, Canada. It is located about 42 km east of Chauvin, Alberta. Yonker is located along the Canadian National Railway (Formerly the Grand Trunk Pacific Railway (GTPR) until 1923). The community gets its name from Mr. O. Winter, who was a contractor for the Grand Trunk Pacific Railway. This line was named alphabetically, from the east, "Vera", after his daughter, "Winter" after himself; and to the west (skipping over 'x') "Yonker", named after his mother's family.

See also

 List of Grand Trunk Pacific Railway stations
 List of communities in Saskatchewan
 List of ghost towns in Saskatchewan

Senlac No. 411, Saskatchewan
Unincorporated communities in Saskatchewan
Ghost towns in Saskatchewan
Division No. 13, Saskatchewan